Skic  (German: Kietz; before 1926: Skietz) is a village in the administrative district of Gmina Złotów, within Złotów County, Greater Poland Voivodeship, in west-central Poland.

The village has a population of 500.

References

Skic